Clarence Cooper (born May 5, 1942) is a senior United States district judge of the United States District Court for the Northern District of Georgia.

Early life and education
Cooper was born in Decatur, Georgia. He later moved to the city of Atlanta, where he graduated from David T. Howard High School in 1960. He received a Bachelor of Arts degree from Clark College in Atlanta, Georgia in 1964. He received a Juris Doctor from Emory University School of Law in 1967. He is a member of the Omega Psi Phi fraternity. Cooper received a Master of Public Administration from Harvard University, John F. Kennedy School of Government in 1978. He also received a diploma from Massachusetts Institute of Technology in connection with a research proposal he developed.

Military service
He served in the United States Army from 1968 to 1970 reaching the rank of Staff Sergeant. He was decorated with the Bronze Star, a Certificate of Commendation, the National Defense Service Medal, the Army Good Conduct Medal, the Vietnam Service Medal, and the Vietnam Campaign Medal.

Judicial career

State judicial service
He was an Attorney, Atlanta Legal Aid Society, Georgia in 1967. He was an Assistant district attorney of Fulton County, Georgia in 1968 and from 1970 to 1975. He was a judge on the City of Atlanta Municipal Court, Georgia from 1975 to 1980. Cooper was the first African-American appointed to a full-time judgeship on the Atlanta Municipal Court and the first African-American ever elected to a county-wide judgeship on the Fulton Superior Court. He was also the first African American assistant district attorney hired to a State Prosecutor's office in Georgia in 1968. Judge Cooper was the presiding Judge in the trial of convicted Atlanta child murderer, Wayne Williams, for serial killings that occurred in 1979 through 1981. He was a judge on the Fulton Superior Court, Georgia from 1980 to 1990. He was a judge on the Georgia Court of Appeals from 1990 to 1994.

Federal judicial service
Cooper was nominated by President Bill Clinton to be a United States District Judge of the United States District Court for the Northern District of Georgia on March 9, 1994, to a seat vacated by Richard Cameron Freeman. Cooper was confirmed by the United States Senate on May 6, 1994, and received commission on May 9, 1994, and he assumed senior status on February 9, 2009.

Cases
Cooper ordered an Atlanta school system to remove stickers from textbooks which call the theory of evolution "a theory, not a fact."  In the case Selman v. Cobb County School District, he ruled that these stickers are an endorsement of religion and as such violate the Establishment Clause of the US Constitution.

Cooper was assigned to the case of Whitaker v. Perdue, a federal challenge to Georgia House Bill 1059 which requires that registered sexual offenders cannot live or work within 1,000 feet from schools, school bus stops, churches, day care centers, and areas where children gather, such as parks, recreation centers, playgrounds, swimming pools, etc. In July 2006, Judge Cooper issued a restraining order barring enforcement of the law near the vicinity of bus stops. In August, he certified a class-action lawsuit on behalf of all of Georgia's 11,000 registered sex offenders instead of just the eight plaintiffs. On March 30, 2007, the judge dismissed some of the plaintiff's claims from the suit, including the claim that the law represented cruel and unusual punishment; the rest of the case will go forward. Plaintiff's lawyers had until June 1, 2007, to file a new, revised complaint.

Personal life
Cooper has a wife, Shirley Cooper, who was the first black food service coordinator for Atlanta-Fulton County school system. Cooper has two children: Jennae Marie Cooper, also known as J. Marie Cooper, a film producer and author of children's book The Candy Judge; and son Corey Cooper works in computer technology.

Namesake awards
 Judge Clarence Cooper Judicial Section Award (this award is given to jurists for outstanding service to the judiciary and the community). 
 Judge Clarence Cooper Legacy Award

Awards and honors
 2003 Hall of Fame 
 2010 Trumpet Award Honoree  IMDB
 2011 Emory History Makers

See also 
 List of African-American federal judges
 List of African-American jurists

References

External links
 

1942 births
Living people
Georgia (U.S. state) state court judges
Judges of the United States District Court for the Northern District of Georgia
United States district court judges appointed by Bill Clinton
Georgia Court of Appeals judges
African-American judges
Harvard Kennedy School alumni
People from Decatur, Georgia
Emory University School of Law alumni
Clark Atlanta University alumni
20th-century American judges
Politicians from Atlanta
United States Army soldiers
United States Army personnel of the Vietnam War
21st-century American judges